According to a U.S. Department of Justice study, men rape and sexually assault Native American women more than 2.5 times than any other ethnicity. The same study shows that men victimize Native American women the most by all races out of all populations in the United States.
 
In most cases the FBI investigates the crime and the office of the United States Attorney decides whether to prosecute as opposed to tribal law enforcement. Prosecuting men for assaulting, raping, kidnapping, and murdering women on Native American soil has been called an extremely important first step in a series of legal changes that would hold white men accountable for crimes at the community, state, and federal level.

Definition

Sexual violence is any sexual act or attempt to obtain a sexual act by violence or coercion, acts to traffic a person or acts directed against a person's sexuality, regardless of the relationship to the victim.  The World Health Organization (WHO) in its 2002 World Report on Violence and Health defined sexual violence as: "any sexual act, attempt to obtain a sexual act, unwanted sexual comments or advances, or acts to traffic, or otherwise directed, against a person's sexuality using coercion, by any person regardless of their relationship to the victim, in any setting, including but not limited to home and work". WHO's definition of sexual violence includes but is not limited to rape, which is defined as physically forced or otherwise coerced penetration of the vulva or anus, using a penis, other body parts or an object. Sexual violence consists in a purposeful action of which the intention is often to diminish the human dignity of the victim(s) and to inflict severe humiliation on them. In the case where others are forced to watch acts of sexual violence, such acts aim at intimidating the larger community.

Rape in the United States is defined by the Department of Justice as "penetration, no matter how slight, of the anus or vagina with any body part or object, or oral penetration by a sex organ of another person, without the consent of the victim." While terminology and definitions of rape vary by jurisdiction in the United States, the FBI revised its definition to eliminate a requirement that the crime involve an element of force.

Statistics and data

Amnesty International's "Maze of Injustice" Report
The Missing and Murdered Indigenous Women crisis has been minimally studied and effectively ignored in the United states.  In 2020 the Savana’s Act was signed to clarify the responsibilities of Federal, State, Tribal, and local governments and law enforcement agencies with respect to responding to cases of missing and murdered Indians; increasing coordination and communication between agencies; empowering Tribal governments with the resources and information necessary to effectively respond to cases; and increasing the collection of data relating to missing and murdered Indian men, women, and children.  The Savana’s Act has only analyzed data, but has not enforced any solutions. The history of colonization and systemic racism enforced by the Federal Government who continually fail to prosecute or otherwise punish the perpetrators of violent crimes against Indigenous women has further perpetuated the cycle of injustice for Native women. The lack of justice for Native women has caused Native women to be less likely to report because of the thought of making matters worse.

Amnesty International published "Maze of Injustice: the failure to protect indigenous women from sexual violence in the USA", in order to represent the voices of survivors of sexual violence. The research was done for the report in 2005 and 2006 in three different locations with different policing and juridical arrangements. Those locations include Standing Rock Sioux Reservation in North and South Dakota, state of Oklahoma, and the state of Alaska. Amnesty International interviewed victims of sexual assault, tribal, state, and federal law enforcement officials, prosecutors and tribal judges for the report. They did not interview the rapists. While finding officials to interview for the report, the Executive Office of US Attorneys told them individual US attorneys cannot participate in the survey.

The report opens with the story of a white man raping a young Alaska Native woman. In July 2006, the man raped the woman, who was rushed to the ER where medical staff treated her as a drunk. They later sent her to a non-Native shelter for women where they treated her as a drunk because of her trauma. Most Native women don't report their assaults because of the fear nothing will be done.  Another story that the article reported was the story of four men raping a 21-year-old Native woman who later died in 2003. The U.S. would not hold these men accountable for their crime and used questioning of jurisdictions as an excuse. Each woman that shared her story in the report had a common element in their stories. The injustice these women faced were mainly based on stereotypes: the Federal and State legal system blamed the victims by using the stereotype that they were drunk.

When pursuing justice women go through a maze between tribal, state and federal law. The women are first asked "was it in our jurisdiction and was the perpetrator Native American?" when they first contact the police department. It takes a lot of time just to have your case heard so women give up. The Amnesty International report go on to list reasons why they believe these injustices are occurring. The first excuse for injustice they use is "lack of training" and "delay or failure to respond of police officers." If the police officers are not the first to respond the women lose confidence in pursuing a case against the perpetrators. The next excuses for injustice presented are issues within each level of the US's legal system. The justice system uses the excuse of "lack of funding." Also, to make sure white men are not held accountable for violent crime, the federal government limits how many prison sentences tribal courts can make. The federal government also prohibits tribal courts from prosecuting Non-Native suspects because of the 1978 Oliphant v. Suquamish case. On a federal level the issue of discrimination and limitations on prosecution of sexual assault is a reason for injustice. Things are a little more complicated on a States level. Oppression and the inability for the courts to see Native Americans as people cause injustice on a state level.

The Amnesty International report gives suggestions as to how to stop violence against Indigenous women. Some of their recommendations include:"Federal and state governments should take effective measures, in consultation and co-operation with Native American and Alaska Native peoples, to combat prejudice and eliminate stereotyping of and discrimination against Indigenous peoples. The federal government should take steps – including by providing sufficient funding – to ensure the full implementation of the 2005 reauthorization of the Violence Against Women Act, particularly Title IX (Tribal Programs). Law enforcement agencies should recognize in policy and practice that all police officers have the authority to take action in response to reports of sexual violence, including rape, within their jurisdiction and to apprehend the alleged perpetrators in order to transfer them to the appropriate authorities for investigation and prosecution. In particular, where sexual violence is committed in Indian Country and in Alaska Native villages, tribal law enforcement officials must be recognized as having the authority to apprehend both Native and non-Native suspects. Federal authorities should ensure that tribal police forces have access to federal funding to enable them to recruit, train, equip and retain sufficient law enforcement officers to provide adequate law enforcement coverage which is responsive to the needs of the Indigenous peoples they serve."

National Institute of Justice Research Report 
In May 2016, the National Institute of Justice released a report titled, "Violence Against American Indian and Alaska Native Women and Men: 2010 Findings from the National Intimate Partner and Sexual Violence Survey." The study collected data related to mental and physical violence among Native American men and women and the possible effects of this violence. 3,978 American Indian and Alaska Natives were surveyed (2,473 of which were women and 1,505 were men). According to the survey, 56.1% of American Indian or Alaska Native women had experienced sexual violence at one point in their lifetime and 14.4% experienced sexual violence the year preceding the survey. Furthermore, 55.5% of female respondents had experienced physical violence from an intimate partner in their lifetime and 8.6% had experienced intimate partner violence in the year preceding the survey.

Representations and stereotypes in American culture 
The ways in which Native American women have been represented in American cultures have been historically controversial. There are many places in which stereotypical representations are carried out; movies, television shows, books, as well as within many other facets of American culture. These representations often depict Native American women in a sexualized way.

Fashion and costumes

Victoria's Secret fashion show controversy 
The 2012 Victoria's Secret fashion show has been widely criticized for its depiction and use of a headdress on the runway which was said to promote harmful stereotypes of sexualized Native American women. Karlie Kloss, a Victoria's Secret model at the time, wore a floor-length imitation Native American headdress. This segment of the runway show featured Victoria's Secret models in costumes that were meant to represent the twelve months of the year; Kloss in her headdress representing November. This specific segment of Kloss in a headdress was pulled from the official broadcast of the fashion show due to backlash. Victoria's Secret also issued an apology through their official Twitter account: "We are sorry that the Native American headdress in our fashion show has upset individuals. The outfit will be removed from the broadcast." Karlie Kloss also issued an apology on Twitter: "I am deeply sorry if what I wore during the VS Show offended anyone. I support VS's decision to remove the outfit from the broadcast."

Urban Outfitters' Navajo-branded clothing controversy 
In 2012, Urban Outfitters came out with a line of clothes and products that illegally used the Navajo name. This line included "Navajo hipster panties," and "Navajo print flask." This illegal product line was accused of propagating harmful stereotypes of Native American women by tying women's underwear to the Navajo name and of Native Americans in general by tying a flask to the Navajo name as well. The Navajo Nation filed a lawsuit against Urban Outfitters in response, and the retail store eventually settled.

Halloween costume controversy 
Another example of this harmful representation is the trend of "sexy" Native American Halloween costumes. On one costume site, some Native American costumes for sale on the website were called, "Native American Seductress," and, "War Chief Hottie Costume." These kinds of costumes are said to not only appropriate Native American culture (by using traditional Native American clothing to make profit), but also propagate harmful stereotypes of Native American women. On October 30, 2017, there was a protest against these kinds of costumes in Phoenix, Arizona. The organizers of this protest were people who opposed the selling of these Halloween costumes. This protest was specifically targeted at Yandy, a popular online costume store that supplied multiple costumes depicting Native American women in a sexualized way. In October of the following year, the same group organized a second protest in the same location. An online petition to pressure Yandy to remove these costumes gained over 35,000 signatures. It was not until the next year that Yandy silently took the controversial Native American costumes off of their website.

Videos and film

No Doubt's controversial music video 
In 2012, No Doubt, an American rock band, released a music video for their song, "Looking Hot" that featured Gwen Stefani. This music video included Native American imagery as well as Gwen Stefani wearing Native American-inspired clothing in a supposed sexualized manner. In response to backlash, No Doubt removed the music video from their platforms and released this statement:"As a multi-racial band our foundation is built upon both diversity and consideration for other cultures. Our intention with our new video was never to offend, hurt or trivialize Native American people, their culture or their history. Although we consulted with Native American friends and Native American studies experts at the University of California, we realize now that we have offended people. This is of great concern to us and we are removing the video immediately. The music that inspired us when we started the band, and the community of friends, family, and fans that surrounds us was built upon respect, unity and inclusiveness. We sincerely apologize to the Native American community and anyone else offended by this video. Being hurtful to anyone is simply not who we are."

Pejorative terms in American society

"Squaw" 
The world "squaw" is largely considered a derogatory slur that is used in reference to Native American women. Its origins are somewhat unknown; however, it is debated if it could be in reference to female genitalia or rather a word for "woman." Merriam-Webster defines "squaw" as, "now usually offensive: an American Indian woman," or, "dated, usually disparaging: woman, wife."

The current controversy around this word comes from the fact that many places in the United States contain the word "squaw" in their name. The state of Oregon had the most landmarks with the term "squaw" in the title than any other states in 2005. Many states, including Oregon, have since outlawed the use of the term in public land features and have required many sites to be renamed. It is argued that the prevalent use of this term in the United States contributes to the normalization of the use of the derogatory term as well as the normalization of the sexualization of Native American women.

Organizations 
There are many Native American organizations that are dedicated to fighting sexual victimization as well as gender-based violence at large in their communities and beyond.

National Indigenous Women's Resource Center (NIWRC) 
The National Indigenous Women's Resource Center (NIWRC) is a non-profit dedicated to ending gender-based violence directed at Native American women through grassroots advocacy. Their mission statement on their website is as follows: "Our mission is to provide national leadership to end violence against American Indian, Alaska Native and Native Hawaiian women by supporting culturally grounded, grassroots advocacy." According to their 2019 annual report, they led ten awareness month/day campaigns, nine resource outreach events, and six on-site technical assistance events. They also hosted eleven online webinars that gained 1,448 attendees (these attendees represented 164 tribal areas and communities). Their website had 213,630 views and 89,659 visitors. There were also three publications released by the NIWRC in 2019 focusing on safety for Native American women.

Women of All Red Nations (WARN) 
Women of All Red Nations (WARN) is an activist group dedicated to issues that affect Native American women. WARN was founded in 1974. Their website states,"WARN championed the health of Native American women, the restoration and securing of treaty rights, eliminating Indian mascots for sports teams, and combating the commercialization of Indian culture. They highlighted the high rates of issues caused by nuclear mining and storage on Indian land, such as birth defects, miscarriages and deaths. They also expressed concerns about forced sterilization of Indian women and the adoption of Indian children by non-Indians."

Mending the Sacred Hoop 
Mending the Sacred Hoop is a Native American non-profit organization that addresses issues related to violence against Native American women. Much of this violence includes sexual victimization. Their website states:"We organize on issues surrounding violence against American Indian/Alaska Native women in our home community of Duluth, MN and throughout the state of Minnesota. We also work with Tribes and Native communities nationally that are addressing the issues of domestic and sexual violence, dating violence, sex trafficking and stalking in their communities. We provide training to strengthen Tribal and Native community responses to these crimes, including the advocacy and systems responses, community understanding and awareness, engaging men in the work to end violence against women, and coordinating community responses that provide for women's safety and uphold offender accountability."

See also

 Custer's Revenge
 Faith Hedgepeth homicide
 INCITE! Women of Color Against Violence
 Indigenous feminism
 Missing and Murdered Indigenous Women (Canada)
 Murder of Susan Poupart
 Native American feminism
 Squaw
 Sterilization of Native American women
 Rape in the United States
 Murder of Kathleen Jo Henry
 Navajo reservations and domestic abuse

References

Sources
The Facts on Violence Against Native American Women 
"Canada: Stolen Sisters," Amnesty International of Canada. 4 Oct. 2004. Accessed 30 Oct. 2005, PDF.
Davis, Angela Y. Violence against Women and the Ongoing Challenge to Racism. New York: Kitchen Table: Women of Color Press, 1985.
Graef, Christine. "NCAI spearheads effort to stop violence against women." Indian Country Today. 29 Dec. 2003: A1. 

Smith, Andrea. "Not an Indian Tradition: The Sexual Colonization of Native Peoples." Hypatia 2003: 73.
United States, Department of Justice. "American Indians and Crime." 30 Oct. 2005 PDF.
"Using Alternative Healing Ways," Mending the Sacred Hoop Technical Assistance Project 2004.  Accessed 30 Oct. 2005, PDF.
"Maze of Injustice, The failure to protect Indigenous women from sexual violence in the USA", Amnesty International. 2007

Native American women
Sex crimes in the United States

Violence against Indigenous women in the United States
Crimes against women
Missing and Murdered Indigenous Women and Girls movement